Comptroller general or comptroller-general or controller general may refer to:
 the Comptroller General of the United States, director of the Government Accountability Office (GAO)
 the Office of the Comptroller General, which exerts internal audit over the Brazilian federal government
 Comptroller General of Convicts (Western Australia)
 the Comptroller General of the Exchequer in the United Kingdom, who authorised the issue of public monies to departments from 1834 to 1866
Comptroller-General of the Nigeria Customs Service, head of Nigerian Customs Service

See also
Controller (disambiguation)
Comptroller
Auditor general
Director of Audit (disambiguation)